The Chief Commissioner of Income Tax Central, abbreviated as CCIT-C, is the revenue enforcement agency of the Central Board of Direct Taxes, Government of India which assesses tax evasion. It functions under the Department of Revenue in the Union Ministry of Finance and is concerned with the administration, assessment, enforcement and prosecution cases of the various direct taxes accruing to the Union Government. Its main job is to assess and provide valuable inputs to the intelligence wings of the government related to tax evasion.

See also
 List of Income Tax Department officer ranks

 Civil Services of India

References

External links

Income Tax Department of India